The Ministry of Energy is the government ministry of Tanzania which is responsible for facilitating the development of the energy sectors.

History 
The Ministry was formed in 2017 after the preceding ministry, the Ministry of Energy and Minerals was split by President John Magufuli to improve supervision.

References

External links 
 

E
Tanzania
Energy in Tanzania